Major chess events that took place in 2019 include the Tata Steel, Shamkir Chess, Grenke Chess Classic and Norway Chess, all won by World Champion Magnus Carlsen.

Events 
December 12 – The United Nations General Assembly approves a resolution designating July 20 as "World Chess Day", marking the date of the establishment of the International Chess Federation (FIDE) in Paris on July 20, 1924.

2019 tournaments

Supertournaments

Open events

FIDE Events

Team events

Rapid & Blitz Tournaments

Deaths
 Tamar Khmiadashvili, a Georgian Woman Grandmaster with multiple wins in the Georgian Women's Championship and Women's World Senior Championship.
 7 January – Khosro Harandi, first Iranian International Master and three-time winner of the Iranian Chess Championship, dies at age 87.
 31 March – Eva Moser, Austria's first Woman Grandmaster and in 2006 became the first woman to win the absolute Austrian Chess Championship, dies at age 36.
 6 July – Ragnar Hoen, Norwegian FIDE Master who won the Norwegian Chess Championship in 1963, 1978, and 1981, dies at age 78.
 11 August – Shelby Lyman, American chess player and teacher, dies at age 82.
 26 August – Pal Benko, Hungarian-American Grandmaster, author and composer of endgame studies, dies at age 91.
 5 September – Nenad Šulava, Croatian Grandmaster, dies at age 56.
 11 September – Zbigniew Szymczak, Polish International Master and Polish chess champion in 1983, dies at age 67.
 9 September – Yoel Aloni, Israeli chess player and problemist, dies at age 90.
 23 September – Harri Hurme, Finnish FIDE Master and International Solving Master, dies at age 74.
 30 December – Beatriz Alfonso Nogue, Spanish Woman FIDE Master, dies at age 51.

References

 
21st century in chess
Chess by year
2019 sport-related lists